Grivac may refer to:

 Grivac, Kostel, Slovenia
 Grivac (Knić), Serbia